Top Chef: New Orleans is the eleventh season of the American reality television series Top Chef. The season was announced on May 10, 2013. Filming took place from early May through late July, beginning in New Orleans, Louisiana and concluding in Maui. The season premiered on October 2, 2013. State and local tourism offices in Louisiana sponsored the season, paying a total of $375,000. The state contribution came from a recovery fund established by BP after the Deepwater Horizon oil spill. In addition to the return of the Last Chance Kitchen, Bravo launched a new web series called Padma's Picks. Debuting on August 14, 2013, the competition, presided over by host Padma Lakshmi, featured ten New Orleans chefs competing for the chance to join the official lineup of contestants and represent the city.

The final episode of the season generated controversy after head judge Tom Colicchio appeared to successfully sway the other judges into awarding the title of Top Chef to Nicholas Elmi, a contestant who had been nearly eliminated in several episodes and had temper control issues. Fan outrage led Colicchio to release the judges' scores on Twitter to justify their decision to give Elmi the victory over eventual runner-up Nina Compton, who was considered a front runner in the competition. Compton was later voted Fan Favorite.

Contestants
The cast of Top Chef: New Orleans originally consisted of 17 chefs. At the conclusion of Padma's Picks, Lakshmi selected Justin Devillier and Michael Sichel to join the regular lineup of contestants. Benedetto Bartolotta had previously competed in the fifth season of Top Chef Masters as the sous-chef of Odette Fada. Stephanie Cmar was also a previous contestant, briefly appearing in Top Chef: Seattle during the qualifying rounds.

Shirley Chung competed in Top Chef Duels, and later returned to compete in Top Chef: Charleston. Stephanie Cmar returned for Top Chef: All-Stars L.A.

Contestant progress

: The chef(s) did not receive immunity for winning the Quickfire Challenge.
: As the winners of Padma's Picks, Justin and Michael were given immunity for the first Elimination Challenge.
: Aaron was eliminated by placing last in the Quickfire Challenge.
: Team Lakshmi consisted of Bene, Brian, Carlos, Nicholas, Nina, Patty, and Travis.
: Louis won Last Chance Kitchen and returned to the competition.
 (WINNER) The chef won the season and was crowned "Top Chef".
 (RUNNER-UP) The chef was a runner-up for the season.
 (WIN) The chef won the Elimination Challenge.
 (HIGH) The chef was selected as one of the top entries in the Elimination Challenge, but did not win.
 (IN) The chef was not selected as one of the top or bottom entries in the Elimination Challenge and was safe.
 (LOW) The chef was selected as one of the bottom entries in the Elimination Challenge, but was not eliminated.
 (OUT) The chef lost the Elimination Challenge.

Episodes

Last Chance Kitchen

References
Notes

Footnotes

External links
 Official website

Top Chef
2013 American television seasons
2014 American television seasons
Television shows set in New Orleans
Television shows filmed in Louisiana
Television shows filmed in Hawaii